Winberg is a surname. Notable people with the surname include:

Amanda Winberg (born 1996), Swedish singer-songwriter, model, and influence
Carl Winberg (1867–1954), Swedish Communist leader
Caroline Winberg (born 1985), Swedish model
Claes-Ulrik Winberg (1925–1989), Swedish industrialist and business executive
Margareta Winberg (born 1947), Swedish Social Democratic politician
Mona Winberg (1932–2009), Canadian journalist and disability rights activist
Pernilla Winberg (born 1989), Swedish ice hockey player